The women's 52 kilograms (half lightweight) competition at the 2010 Asian Games in Guangzhou was held on 15 November at the Huagong Gymnasium.

Misato Nakamura of Japan won the gold medal.

Schedule
All times are China Standard Time (UTC+08:00)

Results

Main bracket

Repechage

References

Results

External links
 
 Draw

W52
Judo at the Asian Games Women's Half Lightweight
Asian W52